Goliathus regius, the Royal Goliath beetle, is a species of beetles of the family Scarabaeidae.

Description
Goliathus regius is very similar to Goliathus goliatus in both structure and colour characters. The body is broad and flat. Elytra are whitish with a complex pattern of black markings, and the pronotum (thoracic shield) has a large black longitudinal stripe. The head bears a black Y-shaped horn  in males, used in battles with other males. Legs are long,  powerful, black. Females have two sharp spikes on the outside of the tibiae. Despite its large body, these beetles fly well. They have a  large and membranous secondary pair of wings. When not in use, these wings are kept completely folded beneath the elytra. These beetles feed primarily on tree sap and fruits.

Life cycle
The larvae live in the soil and need the protein-rich diet, because they grow very quickly. In captivity they may feed on commercial cat and dog food. Even under optimum conditions, the larvae take about 4 months to mature fully, which corresponds to the duration of the rainy season. When maximum size is reached, the larva constructs a pupal chamber in which it will undergo metamorphosis (pupation) to the adult state. In this stage they spend most of the dry season. The adult does not come up before the rain comes. In captivity the adults can live over a year, but in the wild life is probably much shorter.

Distribution
This species is present in western equatorial Africa, in Equatorial Guinea, Sierra Leone, Ivory Coast, South Burkina Faso, Ghana, Togo, Benin (Dahome), Nigeria and Liberia.

Gallery

References

Cetoniinae
Beetles described in 1835